The Bend Arch–Fort Worth Basin Province is a major petroleum producing geological system which is primarily located in North Central Texas and southwestern Oklahoma. It is officially designated by the United States Geological Survey (USGS) as Province 045 and classified as the Barnett-Paleozoic Total Petroleum System (TPS).

Introduction
Oil and gas in Province 045 are produced from carbonate and clastic rock reservoirs ranging in age from the Ordovician to the Permian. The 1995 USGS Assessment of undiscovered, technically recoverable oil and gas identified six conventional plays in Province 045, which are listed below in Table 1: One continuous unconventional play, the "Mississippian Barnett Shale" (4503), was also considered. The cumulative mean of undiscovered resource for conventional plays was:  of oil,  of natural gas liquids,  associated gas, and  non-associated gas.

Table 1

Notes:
1. Assessment unit number also indicates time span of stratigraphic units.

Continuous-type accumulations include fractured shale and fractured limestone oil and gas, basin-centered gas, coal bed gas, and tight reservoir gas. They typically cover large areas, have source rocks in close association with these unconventional reservoir rocks, and are mostly gas (and in some cases oil) charged throughout their extent. Continuous accumulations commonly have transition zones that grade into more conventional accumulations.

Boundary

The southern and eastern boundaries are defined by county lines that generally follow the Ouachita structural front, although a substantial portion of this structural feature is included near Dallas. The north boundary follows the Texas-Oklahoma State line in the east, where the province includes parts of the Sherman Basin and Muenster Arch. In the west, the north boundary follows the north-east county lines of Oklahoma's three southwestern counties (Harmon, Jackson and Tillman Counties), which include the south flank of the Wichita Mountains and the Hollis Basin. The western boundary trends north-south along county lines defining the junction with the Permian Basin where part of the eastern shelf of the Permian Basin lies in Province 045.

Structural elements
Major structural features include the Muenster and Red River Arches to the north, and the Bend and Lampasas Arches along the central part of Province 045. Along the east portion is an area that includes the Eastern Shelf and Concho Arch, collectively known as the Concho Platform. The Mineral Wells fault runs northeast-southwest through Palo Pinto, Parker, Wise, and Denton Counties and joins with the Newark East fault system. The fault system bisects the Newark East Field (NE-F) creating a zone of poor production in Barnett Shale gas reservoirs. Several faults that cut basement and lower Paleozoic rocks in the southern part of the province are identified at the Ordovician Ellenburger Group stratigraphic level. These faults and associated structures formed during development of the Llano Uplift and Fort Worth Basin with faulting ending by the early Missourian.

Tectonic history

Fort Worth Basin
Evolution of the Fort Worth Basin and Bend Arch structures are critical to understanding burial histories and hydrocarbon generation. The basin resembles other basins of the Ouachita structural belt, such as the Black Warrior, Arkoma, Val Verde, and Marfa Basins that formed in front of the advancing Ouachita structural belt as it was thrust onto the margin of North America. Thrusting occurred during a late Paleozoic episode of plate convergence.

Bend Arch
The Bend Arch extends north from the Llano Uplift. It is a broad subsurface, north-plunging, positive structure. The arch formed as a hingeline by down-warping of its eastern flank due to subsidence of the Fort Worth Basin during early stages of development of the Ouachita structural belt in the Late Mississippian and west tilting in the late Paleozoic which formed the Midland Basin. There is disagreement on the structural history of the Bend Arch. Flippen (1982) suggested it acted as a fulcrum and is a flexure and structural high and that only minor uplift occurred in the area to form an erosional surface on the Chester-age limestones that were deposited directly on top of the Barnett. In contrast, Cloud and Barnes (1942) suggested periodic upwarp of the Bend flexure from mid-Ordovician through Early Pennsylvanian time resulted in several unconformities. The Red River Arch and the Muenster Arch also became dominant structural features during the Late Mississippian and Early Pennsylvanian.

General stratigraphy
Hydrocarbon production from Ordovician and Mississippian formations is mostly from carbonate reservoirs, whereas production in the Pennsylvanian through Lower-Permian Wolfcamp) is mostly from clastic reservoirs. The sedimentary section in the Fort Worth Basin is underlain by Precambrian granite and diorite. Cambrian rocks include granite conglomerate, sandstones, and shale that are overlain by marine carbonate rocks and shale. No production has been reported from Cambrian rocks. The Silurian, Devonian, Jurassic, and Triassic are absent in the Fort Worth Basin.

From Cambrian through Mississippian time, the Fort Worth Basin area was part of a stable cratonic shelf with deposition dominated by carbonates. Ellenburger Group carbonate rocks represent a broad epeiric carbonate platform covering most of Texas and central North America during the Early Ordovician. A pronounced drop in sea level sometime between Late Ordovician and earliest Pennsylvanian time, perhaps related to the broad, mid-North American, mid-Carboniferous unconformity, resulted in prolonged platform exposure. This erosional event removed any Silurian and Devonian rocks that may have been present. The Barnett Shale was deposited over the resulting unconformity. Provenance of the terrigenous material that constitutes the Barnett Shale was from Ouachita thrust sheets and the reactivation of older structures such as the Muenster Arch. Post-Barnett deposition continued without interruption as a sequence of extremely hard and dense limestones were laid down. These limestones have often been confused with the lower part of the overlying Marble Falls Formation (Early Pennsylsvnian), and they have never been formally named, although they are widely referenced in the literature as the "Forestburg Formation." Since the underlying Barnett is generally assumed to be Late Mississippian Chester in age, the superposed Forestburg is occasionally referred to informally as "the Chester Limestones."

As the shallow Late Mississippian seas spread southward and westward from the subsiding Southern Oklahoma Aulacogen, they inundated an uneven Lower Paleozoic surface and almost immediately initiated the growth of reef-forming organic communities. All of the Mississippian-age reef complexes whose bases have been penetrated by boreholes have been found, without exception, to be resting directly upon the underlying Ordovician rocks. But although reef growth began at the same time as Barnett Shale deposition, the reefs did not survive to the end of Barnett time; all known Chappel reefs are immediately overlain by the typical Barnett Shale facies except for a very few in central Clay County that have been very deeply breached by pre-Atokan erosion. The reef complexes are subdivisible into three constituent facies: the reef core, the reef flanks, and the inter-reef area. The reef cores are porous enough to serve as stratigraphic traps for oil and gas, and they have yielded excellent production in the northern part of the Fort Worth Basin for three-quarters of a century. The Chappel buildups are often referred to as "pinnacle reefs," but that is a misnomer. They may appear as pinnacles on a cross section with an exaggerated vertical scale (see cross sections A-A′ and B-B′ above), but in reality they have almost exactly the same height/width aspect ratio as a fried chicken egg sunny side up.  The reef core, of course, is represented by the egg yolk, and the reef flank debris are represented by the egg white. The inter-reef facies is represented by a black, calcareous, bituminous shale. Where it occurs in Jack County it is typically 30 to 40 feet (9 to 12 meters) thick, and it is synonymous with the calcareous basal shale member of the Barnett. Consequently, the proximity of a given borehole to a nearby reef complex can be qualitatively estimated by the degree to which this lower member of the Barnett has been impregnated with calcite. 

Clastic rocks of provenance similar to the Barnett dominate the Pennsylvanian part of the stratigraphic section in the Bend Arch–Fort Worth Basin. With progressive subsidence of the basin during the Pennsylvanian, the western basin hinge line and carbonate shelf, continued migrating west. Deposition of thick basinal clastic rocks of the Atoka, Strawn, and Canyon Formations occurred at this time. These Mid- and Late Pennsylvanian rocks consist mostly of sandstones and conglomerates with fewer and thinner limestone beds.

Petroleum production history
Hydrocarbon shows were first encountered in Province 045 during the mid-nineteenth century while drilling water wells. Sporadic exploration began following the Civil War, and the first commercial oil discoveries occurred in the early 1900s. In 1917, discovery of Ranger field stimulated one of the largest exploration and development "booms" in Texas. The Ranger field produces from the Atoka-Bend formation, a sandstone-conglomerate reservoir that directly overlies the Barnett formation. Operators drilled more than 1,000 wildcats in and around the Fort Worth Basin attempting to duplicate the success of Ranger. These wildcat efforts resulted in the discovery of more fields and production from numerous other reservoirs including Strawn fluvial/deltaic sandstones, Marble Falls carbonate bank limestones, the Barnett siliceous shale, and occasional upper Ellenburger dolomitic limestones. By 1960, the province reached a mature stage of exploration and development as demonstrated by the high density and distribution of well penetrations and productive wells. A majority of the commercial hydrocarbons consist of oil in Pennsylvanian reservoirs.

Province 045 is among the more active drilling areas during the resurgence of domestic drilling, which began after the OPEC oil embargo in 1973. It has consistently appeared on the list of the ten most active provinces in terms of wells completed and footage drilled. More than 9100 oil wells and 4,520 gas wells were drilled and completed in this area from 1974 to 1980.

Petroleum data: selected fields

Source rock
The primary source rock of the Bend Arch–Fort Worth Basin is Mississippian Chester-age Barnett Shale, perhaps including the overlying Chesterian Forestburg Formation. The Barnett commonly exhibits an uncommonly high gamma-ray log response. Other potential source rocks of secondary importance are Early Pennsylvanian and include dark fine-grained carbonate rock and shale units within the Marble Falls Limestone and the black shale facies of the Smithwick/Atoka Shale. The Barnett Shale was deposited over much of North Central Texas; however, because of post-depositional erosion, the present distribution of Barnett is limited to Province 045. It is eroded in areas along the Red River-Electra and Muenster Arches to the north, the Llano uplift to the south where it outcrops, and the easternmost portion of the province where the Barnett laps onto the Eastern Shelf-Concho Platform.

Average total organic carbon (TOC) content in the Barnett Shale is about 4% and TOC is as high as 12% in samples from outcrops along the Llano uplift on the south flank of the Fort Worth Basin. It has geochemical characteristics similar to other Devonian-Mississippian black shales found elsewhere in the US (e.g., Woodford, Bakken, New Albany, and Chattanooga Formations). These black shales all contain oil-prone organic matter (Type II kerogen) based on hydrogen indices above 350 milligrams of hydrocarbons per gram of TOC and generate a similar type of high quality oil (low sulfur, >30 API gravity). Although kerogen cracking decomposition is a source of oil and gas from the Barnett Shale, the principal source of gas in the Newark East Field is from cracking of oil and bitumen.

Thermal maturity
Low maturation levels in the Barnett Shale at vitrinite reflectance (Ro), estimated at 0.6-0.7%, yield oils of 38° API gravity  in Brown County. Oils found in Shackelford, Throckmorton, and Callahan Counties as well, as in Montague County, are derived from Barnett Shale at the middle of the zone of oil generation (oil window) thermal maturities levels (≈0.9% Ro). Although condensate is associated with gas production in Wise County, Barnett source rock maturity is generally 1.1% Ro or greater. The zone of wet gas generation is in the 1.1-1.4% Ro range, whereas the primary zone of dry gas generation (main gas window) begins at a Ro of 1.4%.

Thermal maturity of Barnett Shale can also be derived from TOC and Rock-Eval (Tmax) measurements. Although Tmax is not very reliable for high maturity kerogens due to poor pyrolysis peak yields and peak shape, the extent of kerogen transformation can be utilized. For example, Barnett Shale having a 4.5% TOC and a hydrogen index of less than 100 is in the wet or dry gas windows with equivalent Ro values greater than 1.1% TOC. In contrast, low maturity Barnett Shale from Lampasas County outcrops have initial TOC values averaging about 12% with hydrocarbon potentials averaging 9.85% by volume. A good average value for Barnett Shale is derived from the Mitcham #1 well in Brown County where TOC is 4.2% and hydrocarbon potential is 3.37% by volume. Using these data we can determine TOC values will decrease 36% during maturation from the immature stage to the gas-generation window. Samples from the T. P. Simms well in the Newark East gas-producing area have average TOC values of 4.5%, but greater than 90% of the organic matter is converted to hydrocarbons. Thus, its original TOC was about 7.0% with an initial estimated potential of 5.64% by volume. Any oil generated would be expelled into shallow (or deeper) horizons as in the west and north, or cracked to gas where measured vitrinite reflectance is above 1.1% Ro.

Hydrocarbon generation
The Barnett Shale is thermally mature for hydrocarbon generation over most of its area. Barnett source rock is presently in the oil-generation window along the north and west parts of the province, and in the gas window on the east half of the Barnett-Paleozoic TPS. Expulsion of high-quality oil from the Barnett was episodic and began at low (Ro = 0.6%) thermal maturity. Thirty-two oils from Wise and Jack Counties were analyzed to determine the characteristics of the generating source rock. API gravity and sulfur content were integrated with high-resolution gas chromatography (GC) and Gas chromatography-mass spectrometry (GCMS) analyses. The API gravity of the oils ranges from 35° to 62° and sulfur contents are low (<0.2%), which is characteristic of high thermal maturity oils. Biomarkers from GCMS analyses show oils were sourced from marine shale, based on sterane distribution and the presence of diasteranes. Carbon isotopic analyses of saturated and aromatic hydrocarbon fractions support hydrocarbon generation from a single-source unit. In the main gas-producing area of fractured Barnett Shale, the gas generation window is along a trend sub-parallel to the Ouachita thrust front. Jarvie (2001) reported the British Thermal Unit (BTU) content of Barnett gas is directly proportional to Ro levels.

Reservoir rocks
Reservoir rocks include clastic and carbonate rocks ranging in age from Ordovician to Early Permian. Most production from conventional reservoirs is from Pennsylvanian rocks, whereas the only recognized production from unconventional accumulations is from Mississippian fractured Barnett Shale and early Pennsylvanian (Morrowan) fractured Marble Falls Limestone. Conglomerate of the Pennsylvanian Bend Group is the main producing reservoir in the Boonsville Bend Field with cumulative production through 2001 exceeding  of gas. Oil sourced from Barnett Shale is produced from numerous reservoir rocks in the Bend Arch–Fort Worth Basin, including Barnett Shale, Caddo Formation, Canyon Group, Marble Falls Formation, Chappel Limestone, Bend Group, and Ellenburger Group.

Seal rocks
Seal rocks in the Barnett-Paleozoic TPS are mostly shale units and dense, low permeability carbonate rock that are distributed on both regional and local scales. Although these formations are not considered seal rocks in areas where they are tight and not water wet, they serve as barriers confining hydraulic-induced fracturing (frac barriers) and help retain formation pressures during well stimulation.

Traps
Traps for conventional hydrocarbon accumulations are mostly stratigraphic for carbonate rock reservoirs and both structural and stratigraphic in clastic-rock reservoirs. Stratigraphic traps in carbonate rocks result from a combination of facies and depositional topography, erosion, updip pinchout of facies, and  diagenetically controlled enhanced-permeability and porosity zones. A good example of a carbonate stratigraphic trap is the pinnacle reef traps of the Chappel Limestone, where local porous grainstone and packstone are restricted to isolated buildups or reef clusters on the eroded Ellenburger Group. Chappel pinnacle reefs are draped and sealed by the overlying Barnett Shale. Stratigraphic traps in Pennsylvanian Atoka  sandstones and conglomerates are mainly pinch outs related to facies changes or erosional truncation.

Fractured Barnett Shale
Lesser amounts of high-quality (35-40° API gravity, low sulfur) oil is produced from Barnett Shale in the province's north and western portions where it exhibits low thermal maturity (Ro ≈ 0.6%). Similar quality oils (40-50° API gravity), and condensates associated with gas are produced in Wise County where the Barnett is of higher thermal maturity. Gas production is from hydraulically fractured black siliceous shale. Calorific values of gases from NE-F commonly range between 1,050 and 1,300 BTU. The Barnett's main producing facies is a black, organic-rich siliceous shale with a mean composition of about 45% quartz, 27% clay (mostly illite/smectite, and illite), 10% carbonate (calcite, dolomite, and siderite), 5% feldspar, 5% pyrite, and 5% TOC. Average porosity in the productive portions is about 6% and matrix permeability is measured in nanodarcies.

Three assessment units have been proposed for the Barnett Shale continuous accumulations, each with different geologic and production characteristics: 
 a NE-F gas "sweet spot" where the Barnett is siliceous, thick, within the gas generation window, slightly overpressured, and enclosed by dense, tight overlying Forestburg Limestone and underlying Viola Limestone and Simpson Group as frac barriers;
 an outlying area where the Barnett is within the gas-generation window but the subcrop is the porous Ellenburger and the overlying Marble Falls Limestone barrier may be absent; and
 an area of lesser potential where overlying and underlying barriers may be absent and production includes oil and gas from fractured Barnett Shale.
The siliceous nature of the Barnett Shale, and its relation to fracture enhancement in NE-F, was noted by Lancaster.  Also, the second assessment unit, where the Barnett Shale subcrop is Ellenburger Group carbonate rocks, is being tested by several operators. The unit's resource potential will be guided by the results of current testing with directional wells and various completion methods to determine optimum completion techniques for gas recovery.

Historically, estimated ultimate recoveries (EURs) for Barnett gas wells at NE-F increased with time, as follows: 
300 to 500 million cubic feet  of gas before 1990;
600 to 1000 million cubic feet  of gas between 1990 and 1997; and
800 to 1200 million cubic feet  of gas between 1998 and 2000.
The progressive increase in EUR in Barnett wells is the result of improved geologic and engineering concepts that guide development of the Barnett continuous gas play. Moreover, recompletion of wells after about five years of production commonly adds  to its EUR.

See also
East Texas oil field
Barnett Shale

Notes

References
Barnett Shale Energy Education Council
Texas Railroad Commission Public Interactive Data
Abdel-Wahab, M. (1980) Stratigraphy of the Strawn (Pennsylvanian), Colorado River Valley, North-Central Texas, master's thesis, University of Texas
Allard, J. (2000) Barnett Shale play hot in North Texas
Ball, M. (1996) Province 045: USGS National Assessment of Oil and Gas resources
Ball, M. (1995) Bend Arch-Fort Worth Basin Province (045) USGS
Bowker, K. (2002) Developments of Barnett Shale, Fort Worth Basin: Rocky Mountain Geologists & Petroleum Technology Transfer Council
Devon Energy Corp. (2002) Mid-year Operations and Barnett Shale school
Flippin, J. (1982) Stratigraphy, Structure, and Economic Aspects of Paleozoic strata, Erath County: Dallas Geological Society (DGS)
Faust, L (1963) The Fargo Field: A Case History Geophysics, V. 28, Issue 6
Gautier, D., 1995 National assessment Oil and gas resources: USGS DDS-30
George, M. C. (2016). "The Muenster Uplift of North Texas": The Muenster Uplift of North Texas: The Easternmost Expression of the Pennsylvanian Ancestral Rockies
Hall, J. (2002) Barnett Shale geology, in Devon Energy Corp.
Henry, J. D. (1982) Stratigraphy of the Barnett Shale (Mississippian) and Associated Reefs in the Northern Fort Worth Basin: Dallas Geological Society (DGS)
Jarvie, D. (2002) Barnett Shale as an analog for other black shales: AAPG Meeting, New Mexico.
Jarvie, D. (2004) Evaluation of Hydrocarbon Generation & Storage, Barnett Shale, Ft. Worth Basin Special BEG/PTTC Presentation
Kerans, C. (1988) Karst-controlled reservoir heterogeneity; Ellenburger Group Carbonates West Texas: AAPG Bulletin, v. 7
Klett, T. (2000) Assessment hierarchy and initial province ranking, USGS World Petroleum Assessment
Lancaster, D. (1993) Research characterize Fort Worth Basin's Barnett Shale: OGJ, v. 91
Magoon, L. (2000)  Natural fluid network constrains assessment unit, USGS World Assessment
Mapel, W. (1979) Paleotectonic investigations of the Mississippian System: USGS Paper 1010
Pollastro, M. (2003) Assessing Undiscovered Resources of the Barnett-Paleozoic TPS USGS
Schenk, C. (2001) National Assessment of Oil & Gas Series, USGS FS-113-01
Schmoker, J. (1996) Method for assessing continuous-type hydrocarbon accumulations: USGS DDS-30
Shirley, K. (2002) Barnett Shale living up to potential: AAPG Explorer, v. 23, no. 7
Swindell, G. (2002) Newark East Barnett Shale gas field, cumulative production graph
Walper, J. (1982) Plate tectonic evolution of the Fort Worth Basin: DGS

Geologic provinces of Texas
Geology of Oklahoma